Aurora Floyd is a 1912 American silent short drama film directed by Theodore Marston based on the 1863 British novel of the same name by Mary Elizabeth Braddon. The film stars Florence La Badie in the title role, William Garwood, and Harry Benham. The film also stars Maude Fealy and David Thompson.

Cast
 Florence La Badie as Aurora Floyd
 Harry Benham as John Mellish, Aurora's second husband
 David Thompson as John Conyers, Aurora's first husband
 Justus D. Barnes as Aurora's father
 William Garwood
 Maude Fealy

External links

1912 drama films
1912 short films
1912 films
Silent American drama films
American silent short films
American black-and-white films
Films based on British novels
Films directed by Theodore Marston
Thanhouser Company films
1910s American films
American drama short films
1910s English-language films